Lifter may refer to:
 Ion-propelled aircraft, a device that can generate thrust using ionised air with no moving parts
 Lifter (band), an American grunge band
 Lifter Puller, an American indie rock band
 Lifter (album), a 2001 album by American band Edgewater
 Lifter (comics), a Marvel Comics character
 Liquid fluoride thorium reactor, shortened to "LFTR" and pronounced "lifter"
 Tappet, part of an internal combustion engine
 A filter that operates on a cepstrum, in signal processing
 "Lifter", a song by Deftones from the album Adrenaline

See also